The 1999 Grand Prix of Atlanta was the second round of the 1999 American Le Mans Series season.  It took place at Road Atlanta, Georgia, on April 18, 1999.

Race results
Class winners in bold.

Statistics
 Pole Position - #16 Dyson Racing - 1:13.817
 Fastest Lap - #0 Team Rafanelli - 1:14.150
 Distance - 
 Average Speed -

References

Atlanta
Grand Prix of Atlanta
Grand Prix of Atlanta